First Capital Bank Zimbabwe Limited, formerly known as Barclays Bank of Zimbabwe, is a commercial bank in Zimbabwe, licensed by the Reserve Bank of Zimbabwe, the central bank and national banking regulator.

The bank is a subsidiary of FMBCapital Holdings Plc, a financial services conglomerate, based in Mauritius with other subsidiaries in Botswana, Malawi, Mozambique, Zambia.

Location
The headquarters and main branch of the bank are located in Barclay House, at the corner of Jason Moyo Street and First Street, in downtown Harare, the largest city and capital of Zimbabwe. The geographical coordinates of the headquarters of First Capital Bank Zimbabwe are:17°49'50.0"S 31°02'59.0"E (Latitude:-17.830556; Longitude:31.049722).

Overview
The bank is a large financial services provider in Zimbabwe, serving large corporations, small-to-medium enterprises (SMEs), as well as individuals. , its total asset base was valued at US$698,744,000, with shareholders' equity of US$116,503,000.

History
Barclays Bank Zimbabwe (BBZ) was established in 1912, and it operated continuously until 2018. As of October 2017, BBZ employed in excess of 700 permanent staff, in a commercial banking network of 26 branches in all large urban areas in the country. In October 2017, it was announced that First Merchant Bank Malawi had purchased a controlling interest in BBZ, for an undisclosed consideration. Under the terms of the sale, the bank was given permission to continue the use of the Barclays name for up to three years, before rebranding.

During the 2008–2012 time frame, the bank employed a maximum of 1,423 employees in January 2008, but the payroll was "rationalized" to about 700, by the time FMB Capital Holdings Plc acquired the bank.

In October  2018, the bank rebranded from Barclays Bank of Zimbabwe to First Capital Bank Zimbabwe  Limited, to reflect its current shareholding.

In March 2019, the bank migrated from the Barclays banking system to a new IT banking system.

Ownership
First Capital Bank Zimbabwe Limited (FCBZL), is a subsidiary of FMB Capital Holdings Plc, a Mauritius-based financial services conglomerate, with subsidiaries in several Southern African countries, including Botswana, Malawi, Mozambique, Zambia, and Zimbabwe. The shares of stock of FCBZL are listed on the Zimbabwe Stock Exchange. The major shareholders in the bank are depicted in the table below, as of October 2017.

Banks of Zimbabwe
Banks established in 1912
Companies based in Harare
FMBCapital Holdings Plc
Companies listed on the Zimbabwe Stock Exchange
1912 establishments in Southern Rhodesia